Makenna Jones (born February 26, 1998) is an American tennis player.

Career

Jones made her WTA main draw debut at the 2021 Silicon Valley Classic, where she received a wildcard to the doubles main draw.

Jones played college tennis at the University of North Carolina at Chapel Hill, where she won the 2021 NCAA doubles championships with partner Elizabeth Scotty.

ITF Finals

Singles: 2 (1 title, 1 runner–up)

Doubles: 5 (4 titles, 1 runner–up)

Notes

References

External links
 
 

1998 births
Living people
Sportspeople from Greenville, South Carolina
American female tennis players
North Carolina Tar Heels women's tennis players